Bassam is an Arabic name and a given name roughly meaning "one who smiles". More accurately, it is the Arabic name "Basem" (often incorrectly written in English as Bassem) that translates to "one who smiles". Basem is the agent noun of the Arabic verb with the root ba-sa-ma, which means to smile. The name "Bassam" is the exaggerated form of the agent noun (Arabic: صيغه مبالغه), and would therefore roughly translates to "one who smiles profusely".

The name is most common in the Levant. Notable people with the name include:

Notable people named Bassam
 Bassam Frangieh (born 1950), scholar of Arabic literature and culture
 Bassam Jamous, Syrian archaeologist
 Bassam Kousa (born 1963), Syrian actor
 Bassam Abdel Majeed (born 1950), Syrian minister 
 Bassam Abdullah bin Bushar al-Nahdi (born 1976), Yemeni wanted by the US FBI
 Bassam Saba (1958–2020), Lebanese musician
 Bassam Shakaa (born 1930), Palestinian politician
 Bassam as-Salhi (born 1960), General Secretary of the Palestinian People's Party
 Bassam Abu Sharif (born 1946), Palestinian politician
 Bassam el-Shammaa (born 1962), Egyptian Egyptologist
 Bassam Al-Soukaria (1580–1667), Lebanese army commander
 Bassam Tahhan, professor of Arabic literature
 Bassam Talhouni, Jordanian lawyer, academic and politician
 Bassam Tibi (born 1944), Syrian-German political scientist
 Bassam Yammine (born 1968), Lebanese businessman
 Bassam Zuamut (1951–2004), Israeli Arab Actor

Surname
 Ibn Bassam (died 1147), Moorish writer
 Rehab Bassam (born 1977), Egyptian blogger
 Steve Bassam, Baron Bassam of Brighton (born 1953), British politician
 Sulayman Al-Bassam, (born 1972), Anglo-Kuwaiti playwright

See also

 USC Bassam, Ivorian football club
Bassem
Basim (disambiguation)
Grand-Bassam

References